Jane Wiseman ( Vaughan; died 1610) was an English recusant and priest harbourer. She narrowly avoided becoming a Catholic martyr after being sentenced to Peine forte et dure. Her daughter Mary Wiseman (born Jane) was the founding prioress of a convent in Leuven.

Life
Her parents are said to be the soldier Cuthbert Vaughan who was the second of the three husbands of Elizabeth Raydon or Roydon. Her mother was said to be related to Tudor royalty. Her father died in the 1560s and her mother on 19 August 1595.

Jane was said to have had over thirty men who wanted to marry her before she settled on Thomas Wiseman. Their household, Braddocks, was known for allegiance to the Catholic religion.

When her husband died, her eldest son William inherited the property. She consulted John Gerard who became the family's chaplain in 1591 and with little persuasion she created a new household, Bullocks, complete with chaplain. Her son was to work with Gerard, asking him for help in proofreading some of his writing. Gerard would go on to become a Catholic hero.

Jane would become renowned for her obstinate recusancy towards the Protestant religion, which led to her being fined and losing properties in Debden and Wimbish. She attended an illegal mass at Braddocks in September 1592 and she was indicted in January 1593. The authorities knew that she had not only been harbouring priests but she had sent four of her daughters abroad to become nuns. The date of her arrest is unknown but by 1595 she had been in prison for some time. She refused a trial by jury after she was charged with 'receiving, comforting, helping and maintaining' priests and was prepared to become a Catholic martyr. Her refusal to plead meant that she was ordered to be pressed by stones until she either entered a plea or died, but this sentence of Peine forte et dure was commuted to one of indefinite imprisonment before it could be carried out. Wiseman was released from prison in 1603 following the accession of James I to the English throne and subsequent pardoning of Catholic prisoners.

Death and legacy
Wiseman died in 1610 knowing that her daughter, Jane, was the prioress, Mary Wiseman (new name in religion), of the new convent at Leuven named St Monica's in 1609.

Private life
She and Thomas had eight children whose names are known but their birth dates are not clear. William was born in the 1550s, John in 1571, Thomas in 1572 and Jane in about 1570. The others were Robert, Anne, Barbara and Bridget.

References

1610 deaths
Year of birth unknown
Recusants
16th-century English women